Antipterna diplosticta is a species of moth in the family Oecophoridae, first described by Alfred Jefferis Turner in 1944 as Ocystola diplosticta. The species epithet, diplosticta, derives from the Greek, διπλοστικτος ("two spotted").  The male holotype for Ocystola diplosticta was collected at Gladstone in Queensland.

Further reading

References

Oecophorinae
Taxa described in 1944
Taxa named by Alfred Jefferis Turner